Margot Noemí Cottens Costa (January 9, 1922 – January 2, 1999) was an Uruguayan actress who made most of her career in Spain.

Selected filmography
 The Count of Monte Cristo (1953)
 My Love Is Called Margarita (1961)
 The Mustard Grain (1962)
 Television Stories (1965)
 La ciudad no es para mí (1966)
 Amor a la española (1967)
 Operation Mata Hari (1968)
 Sor Ye Ye (1968)

1922 births
1999 deaths
Actresses from Montevideo
Uruguayan film actresses
Uruguayan television actresses
Spanish film actresses
Spanish television actresses
Uruguayan emigrants to Spain
20th-century Uruguayan actresses
20th-century Spanish actresses